is a railway station on the Nippō Main Line operated by JR Kyushu in Hiji, Ōita, Japan.

Lines

Layout 
The station consists of two side platforms serving two tracks at grade. The station building is a modern concrete structure, built in 2016, which houses a staffed ticket window, a waiting area and various community facilities. There is also a footbridge, served by elevators, which provides access to the opposite platform as well as 24-hour free passage to the street on the other side of the station.

Management of the station has been outsourced to the JR Kyushu Tetsudou Eigyou Co., a wholly owned subsidiary of JR Kyushu specialising in station services. It staffs the ticket booth which is equipped with a POS machine but does not have a Midori no Madoguchi facility.

Adjacent stations

History
Japanese National Railways (JNR) opened the station on 9 March 1987 as an additional station on the existing track of the  Nippō Main Line. With the privatization of JNR on 1 April 1987, the station came under the control of JR Kyushu.

In 2016, the town of Hiji completed a major urban redevelopment project involving the station. The station was moved 100 metres to the east and a new station building was constructed, incorporated a waiting room, a community interaction area nad gallery as well as a footbridge which is available as a free passage to the street on the other side of the tracks.

Passenger statistics
In fiscal 2016, the station was used by an average of 810 passengers daily (boarding passengers only), and it ranked 189th among the busiest stations of JR Kyushu.

See also
List of railway stations in Japan

References

External links

  

Railway stations in Ōita Prefecture
Railway stations in Japan opened in 1987